Venus Records is a Japanese jazz record label. It was founded in 1992 by Tetsuo Hara, who had worked as a producer for RCA Victor. It mostly works with a select group of artists from Italy, the United States, and Japan, and uses a signature 24-bit mastering process, named "Hyper Magnum Sound," that produces "very powerful sound with strong presence". It is also known for its album covers, which use well-known photographers and frequently feature nudity.

Discography
 VENUS-1002 Albert Ayler Bells (CD, RE, Promo) 1993
 TKCZ-79136 Marzette Watts Marzette Watts (CD, Album, RE) 1993
 TKCZ-79134 Burton Greene Trio The On Tour (CD, Album, RE) 1993
 TKCZ-79130 Giuseppi Logan More (CD, Album, RE) 1993
 TKCZ-79126 Patty Waters Sings (CD, Album, RE) 1993
 TKCZ-79118 Why Not? (CD, Album, RE) 1993
 TKCZ-79108 Giuseppi Logan Quartet The Giuseppi Logan Quartet (CD, Album, RE) 1993
 TKCZ-79102 Albert Ayler Spirits Rejoice (CD, Album, RE) 1993
 TKCZ-79101 Albert Ayler Trio Spiritual Unity (CD, Album, RE) 1993
 TKCZ-79004 Gil Evans Live at the Public Theater (New York 1980) (2xCD, Album, RE) 1993
 TKCZ-79005 Art Pepper with Sonny Clark Trio Holiday Flight - Lighthouse 1953 (2xCD, Album, RE, RM) 1993
 TKCV-79021 Barney Wilen Inside Nitty = Gritty (CD, Album) 1993
 TKCV-79016 Marion Brown Quintet Mirante Do Vale ~ Offering II (CD, Album, RE) 1993
 TKCV-79012 Marion Brown Quintet Offering (CD, Album, RE) 1993
 TKCY-79013 Dewey Redman Featuring Joshua Redman African Venus (CD, Album) 1994
 TKCZ-79158 Albert Ayler Quintet At Slug's Saloon 1966 (2xCD, Album, Comp) 1994
 TKCZ-79024 Richie Beirach Trio Methuselah (CD, Album, RE) 1994
 TKCV-79084 Paul Bley Trio Emerald Blue (CD, Album) 1994
 TKCV-79074 Paul Bley Trio Modern Chant (CD, Album) 1994
 TKCV-79055 Lonnie Smith Trio Purple Haze (CD, Album) 1994
 TKCV-79053 Lonnie Smith Trio Føxy Lady (CD, Album) 1994
 TKCV-79022 Lonnie Smith = John Abercrombie Trio The Afro Blue (CD, Album) 1994
 TKCZ-79506 Sonny Rollins Quintet / Thad Jones Sonny Rollins Plays (CD, Album, RE, Comp) 1995
 TKCZ-36010 Albert Ayler Trio Spiritual Unity (CD, Album, RE, Ltd, 24K) 1996
 TKCV-79307 Archie Shepp Quartet Blue Ballads (CD, Album) 1996
 TKCV-35015 Lee Konitz Quartet Jazz Nocturne
 TKCV-35134 Enrico Rava Italian Ballads (CD, Album) 1996
 TKCV-35018 Lee Konitz Lee Konitz & The Brazilian Band – Brazilian Serenade (CD, Album) 1996
 TKCV-35036 Steve Kuhn Trio Sing Me Softly of the Blues (CD, Album) 1997
 JAS-8007 Kenny Dorham The Arrival of Kenny Dorham (CD, Album, RE) 1997
 JAS-8004 JR Monterose The Message (CD, Album, RE) 1997
 TKCV-35102 Steve Kuhn Trio Love Walked In (CD, Album) 1999
 TKCV-35084 Richie Beirach Trio What Is This Thing Called Love? (CD, Album) 1999
 TKCV-35088 Steve Kuhn Trio Quiereme Mucho (CD, Album) 2000
 TKCV-35098 Steve Kuhn Trio Temptation (CD, Album) 2001
 TKCV-35091 Richie Beirach Trio Romantic Rhapsody (CD, Album) 2001
 TKCV-35307 Steve Kuhn Trio Waltz – Red Side (CD, Album) 2002
 TKCV-35306 Steve Kuhn Trio Waltz – Blue Side (CD, Album) 2002
 TKCV-35305 Richie Beirach Trio No Borders (CD, Album) 2002
 TKCV-35302 Enrico Rava Renaissance (CD, Album) 2002
 TKCV-35343 Super Trio Super Standard (CD, Album) 2004
 TKCV-35524 Archie Shepp Quartet Deja Vu (CD, Album) 2003
 VHCD-78073 Peter Bernstein Stranger in Paradise (CD) 2003
 SSC 1109 Steve Kuhn Love Walked In (CD, Album) 2003
 KACD 0304 Roland Hanna with Ron Carter, Grady Tate Apres Un Reve (CD, Album) 2003
 TKCV-35336 Steve Kuhn Trio Easy to Love (CD, Album) 2004
 TKJV-19157 Nicole Henry Teach Me Tonight (LP, Album) 2005
 TKJV-19145 Simone Romance (LP) 2005
 TKCV-35346 Nicole Henry Teach Me Tonight (CD, Album) 2005
 TKCV-35349 Cedar Walton Midnight Waltz (CD, Album) 2005
 TKCV-35380 Richie Beirach Trio Manhattan Reverie (CD, Album) 2006
 TKCV-35361 Steve Kuhn Trio Pavane for a Dead Princess (CD, Album) 2006
 TKCV-35200 Simone Moonlight Serenade (CD, Album, RE, RM, Pap) 2006
 TKJV-19183 Simone Taking a Chance On Love (LP, Album) 2007
 TKCV-35218 Rob Agerbeek Trio The Very Thought of You (CD, Album) 2007
 TKCV-35397 Simone Taking a Chance On Love (CD, Album) 2007
 TKCV-35395 Steve Kuhn Trio Plays Standards (CD, Album) 2007
 VHJD-8 Marilyn Scott Every Time We Say Goodbye (LP, Album) 2008
 VHJD-19 Simone Let's Fall in Love (LP, Album) 2008
 VHCD-1017 Tessa Souter Nights of Key Largo (CD, Album) 2008
 VHCD-1010 Simone Let's Fall in Love (CD, Album) 2008
 VHCD-1003 Steve Kuhn Trio Baubles, Bangles and Beads (CD, Album) 2008
 TKJV-19194 Nicki Parrott Moon River (LP, Album) 2008
 TKCV-35419 Marilyn Scott Every Time We Say Goodbye (CD, Album) 2008
 TKCV-35417 Richie Beirach Trio Summer Night (CD, Album) 2008
 VHJD-21 Nicki Parrott Fly Me to the Moon (LP) 2009
 VHJD-13 Tessa Souter Nights of Key Largo (LP, Album) 2009
 VHCD-8009 Simone Essential Best (CD, Album, Comp) 2009
 VHCD-5011 Nicki Parrott Moon River (CD, Album) 2009
 VHCD-1021 Phil Woods Quintet Ballads & Blues (CD, Album) 2009
 VHCD-1032 Kenny Barron Trio Minor Blues (CD, Album) 2009
 VHCD-1035 Alexis Cole Someday My Prince Will Come (CD, Album) 2009
 VHCD-1024 Richie Beirach Jazz Adagio (CD, Album) 2009
 VHCD-1023 Nicki Parrott Fly Me to the Moon (CD, Album) 2009
 VHCD-1154 Tete Montoliu Catalonian Rhapsody (CD, Album) 2014
 VHJD-37 Alexis Cole Someday My Prince Will Come (LP, Album) 2010
 VHCD-4122 Simone Romance (CD, Album, RE) 2010
 VHCD-4121 Simone Moonlight Serenade (CD, Album, RE) 2010
 VHCD-1046 Alexis Cole with One for All (3) You'd Be So Nice to Come Home To (CD, Album) 2010
 VHCD-1045 Simone & Her Hawaiian Jazz Band Alomas of Hawaii (CD, Album) 2010
 VHCD-1044 Steve Kuhn Trio I Will Wait for You – The Music of Michel Legrand (CD, Album) 2010
 VHCD-1041 Nicki Parrott Black Coffee (CD, Album) 2010
 VHJD-49 Simone & Her Hawaiian Jazz Band Alomas of Hawaii (LP, Album) 2011
 VHJD-44 Alexis Cole (with One for All) You'd Be So Nice to Come Home To (LP, Album) 2011
 VHJD-41 Nicki Parrott Black Coffee (LP, Album) 2011

References

Japanese record labels
Jazz record labels